The 1871 Monmouthshire by-election was held on 4 March 1871.  The byelection was held due to the resignation of the incumbent Conservative MP, Poulett Somerset.  It was won by the unopposed Conservative candidate Lord Henry Somerset.

Results

See also
Lists of United Kingdom by-elections

References

1871 in Wales
1870s elections in Wales
Elections in Monmouthshire
1871 elections in the United Kingdom
By-elections to the Parliament of the United Kingdom in Welsh constituencies
Unopposed by-elections to the Parliament of the United Kingdom in Welsh constituencies
19th century in Monmouthshire